Pulincunnoo or Pulinkunnoo is an island village in the Kuttanadu region of Alappuzha district in the Indian state of Kerala. The Pampa river in Pulincunnoo is one of the most favored routes of the houseboats tourism operators in Kuttanadu. The village is part of the many islands dotting the famous Kerala Backwaters, a network of lakes, wetlands, and canals crisscrossing through the State. Pulincunno is notable for the annual Rajiv Gandhi Trophy snake boat race held during the months of October–November.

Education
Known for its idyllic life, Pulincunnoo is notable for having heralded English level education since the olden days. The village has schools and colleges that are hundreds of years old. St. Joseph's Higher Secondary School is one of the important and the oldest institutions in Pulincunnoo, with more than 118 years of its presence. It is known to have produced several sports personalities in the fields of basketball who have gone on to represent the State and country. Many prominent personalities including Sri. M. V. Pylee (former Vice-Chancellor of Cochin University) P T Mathew Kanjickal Pazhayachirayil (Former Judge) Cartoonist Toms (Bobanum Moliyum) Fr. Mathew Chathamparambil (the present Vice-Chancellor of Christ University, Bangalore), etc. are former students of this school.
Cochin University College of Engineering Kuttanad under CUSAT is a famous engineering college at this place. 
ANOSH

People and Life 
The people of Pulincunnu are mostly farmers and fishermen, and a few have converted their ancestral homes into tourist homestays. The village celebrates all religious festivities with equal vigour, and the annual church festival of St. Mary's Church invites devotees from far and wide. The church has been featured in the hit Tamil movie Vinnaithandi Varuvaya, and has formed the backdrop in several Malayalam language movies shot in the village.The Kuttandu Taluk Head Quarters Hospital is also situated in Pulinkunnoo. 

The village has several toddy shops, and duck rearing is also a lucrative occupation. Many members of joint families here have migrated to other cities, and most of the majestic traditional Kerala houses retain the feel of the early 1800s.

Another famous village Kavalam can be reached from Pulinkunnoo by travelling 2 km on Pallikkuttumma - Neelamperoor road.

What To Do 
An ideal backwater destination following the way of life characteristic of Travancore Malayalees, the village is mostly best experienced if you are a leisure traveller. Spend one day or several days here, chatting up with locals, visiting the local market, hanging out at the village centre, dipping your feet in the serene river that flows by, bathing in its shallow and safe waters, exploring the churches, temples and cultural sights and sounds. The hi-tech jetty at Kontyada is major tourist attraction. The jetty can be accessed by boat. The jetty became an attraction after newspapers highlighted it.

How To Reach 

Pulincunnu is situated midway between Alleppey and Changanacherry, 2 km inward from the gorgeous AC Road. The village can be accessed via a road bridge or by a ferry that transports vehicles and people between the village and the shore connecting to the AC Road. There is also a waterway ferry service run by the KSWTDC which has a jetty near the village square. The village is around 20 km from Alleppey and 15 km from Changanacherry.

References

External links
Cochin University College of Engineering Kuttanadu

Islands of Kerala
Villages in Alappuzha district
Islands of India
Populated places in India